Bruiser is a 2022 American drama film written by Ben Medina and Miles Warren, directed by Warren and starring Trevante Rhodes, Shamier Anderson, Jalyn Hall and Shinelle Azoroh.

Cast
Trevante Rhodes as Porter
Shamier Anderson as Malcolm
Jalyn Hall as Darious
Shinelle Azoroh as Monica

Release
The film premiered at the Toronto International Film Festival in September 2022.  It was announced that same month that Bruiser was the first narrative feature film to be acquired by Onyx Collective.  It was released by Hulu in the United States on February 24, 2023.

Reception

Peter Debruge of Variety gave the film a positive review and wrote, "Insightful and universal in so many ways, Warren’s first feature is a confident if sometimes oblique coming-of-age story from an important new voice..."  Lovia Gyarkye of The Hollywood Reporter also gave the film a positive review, calling it "A mellow and compelling spin on a familiar story."  Alex Saveliev of Film Threat rated the film a 9 out of 10 and wrote, "Warren’s film may leave you bruised, but don’t let that stop you from seeking it out."

References

External links
 
 
 

Hulu original films
2022 drama films
American drama films
2020s English-language films